Luoma (Finnish) or Bobäck (Swedish) was a station on the VR commuter rail network located in Kirkkonummi, Finland, between the stations of Mankki and Masala. The station had two tracks, with track one serving trains towards Kirkkonummi and track two towards Helsinki. The station was opened in 1932, then named as Nokka. In that time, there was another station named Luoma, located about a kilometer more towards Helsinki. The station was out of use between 1944 and 1956, as the Porkkala Cape served as a Soviet military base and the frontier passed through the station. When the original Luoma station was abolished in 1978, the Nokka station was renamed as Luoma. Because of very low number of passengers, the station was closed a day after neighbouring station Mankki on 27 March 2016.

Connections
Only the U and L trains between Kirkkonummi and Helsinki stopped at Luoma, the faster S line did not. The Y train towards Karis ran through the station but did not stop.

References

Kirkkonummi
Railway stations in Uusimaa
Railway stations opened in 1932
Railway stations closed in 2016
Defunct railway stations in Finland